Meinel may refer to:

 Meinel (surname)
 4065 Meinel, asteroid